Igor Fedorovich "Egor" Letov ((10 September 1964 – 19 February 2008) was a Russian poet, musician, singer-songwriter, audio engineer and conceptual artist, best known as the founder and leader of the post-punk/psychedelic rock band Grazhdanskaya Oborona. He was also the founder of the conceptual art avant-garde project Kommunizm and psychedelic rock outfit Egor i Opizdenevshie. Letov collaborated with singer-songwriter Yanka Dyagileva and other Siberian underground artists as a record engineer and producer.

Biography

Letov was born in Omsk, Siberia to Fyodor Letov, a military man and World War II veteran from Northern Ural (Perm Krai), and Tamara Letova, a doctor of Russian Cossack origin from Kazakhstan. The Letov family had Russian, Mordvin, Komi and Turkic ancestors. The family moved to Omsk from Semipalatinsk a few years before Egor's birth. From a young age, Egor and his older brother Sergey had health issues, and Yegor experienced clinical deaths in his childhood.

After graduating from school, Egor went to live with his brother, who was a relatively successful jazz saxophonist in Moscow at the time. In Moscow, Letov learned to play some drums and bass guitar, developed contacts with Moscow underground avant-garde artists, and enrolled in a professional technical school as a builder, working as a plasterer.

Two years later, in 1984, Letov left the technical school and returned to Omsk. At this time, he had already started writing poetry and short stories and decided to try music. Letov mostly listened to Rock in Opposition and free jazz in the early '80s, and his first recordings were amateurish garage rock using suitcases instead of drums. Later, Letov characterized these recordings as "talentless curiosity", "baby talk", and "shame and reproach". Soon he found fellow musicians and companions in Omsk, who listened to the same type of music, which was unpopular and little known in the USSR, especially in Siberia, and they started the garage rock band Posev. The most important of these companions was Konstantin Ryabinov (better known as Kuzya UO or Kuzma), a musician and poet, who was Letov's comrade-in-arms in Grazhdanskaya Oborona up to the late 90s, and a close friend. Posev became Grazhdanskaya Oborona in November 1984.

In 1985, the dissident philosophy expressed in Letov's lyrics, as well as his popularity throughout the USSR, resulted in a KGB-initiated internment for three months in a mental hospital, where Letov was forced to take anti-psychotic drugs. On his release, he defiantly wrote a song about Lenin "rotting in his mausoleum".

Letov was a polarizing figure in the Soviet Union. He was controversial in the mid-to-late 1980s when he satirized the Soviet system and developed a gritty Siberian punk sound. After the fall of the Soviet Union, during the 1993 Russian constitutional crisis, Letov developed a fan base among nationalists and communists due to his strong opposition of Yeltsin's government. Letov was one of the founders and the first member of the National Bolshevik Party. He ceased contact with the party around 1999 and distanced himself from politics. In his 2007 interview with Rolling Stone Russia, Letov stated: "In fact, I have always been an anarchist—and I still am. But now I'm more into ecological aspects of contemporary anarchism, eco-anarchism, that's what I've been moving toward recently". In 1997, Letov married Natalia Chumakova, the bass guitarist of Grazhdanskaya Oborona.

Letov died of heart failure in his sleep on 19 February 2008 at his home in Omsk. He was 43 years old.

Influences
In an interview, Letov expressed that his favorite poets were Alexander Vvedensky (1904–1941), one of the OBERIU writers, and the Russian Futurist poets, such as Vladimir Mayakovsky and Aleksei Kruchenykh. At the beginning of his interest in poetry he was influenced by the Austrian poet Erich Fried. He also expressed his interest in Conceptualism, and spoke of his own work in punk music and in creating a public image as a work of conceptual performance art. Letov's favorite writers, who considerably affected his world view and writing style, were Andrei Platonov, Fyodor Dostoevsky, Henry Miller, Bruno Schulz, Flann O'Brien, Leonid Andreev, Ryunosuke Akutagawa, Kōbō Abe, and Kenzaburō Ōe. His worldview was also inspired by Existentialist philosophy, traditions of Russian Cosmism, and Latin American magic realism (Julio Cortázar, Jorge Luis Borges, Gabriel García Márquez).

In music, Letov was a big 60s psychedelic and garage rock fan, especially citing Arthur Lee's Love as his favorite band, as well as Texas noise rock band Butthole Surfers, Genesis P-Orridge's Psychic TV, and The Residents. Other notable influences include Sonic Youth, Ramones, The Stooges, The Velvet Underground, The Fall, Dead Kennedys, The Birthday Party, Swans, Joy Division, Throbbing Gristle, and Einstürzende Neubauten. He also cited industrial, ska and reggae, avant-garde composers such as John Cage, medieval and baroque classical music, Soviet VIA bands and various folk music as influences on Grazhdanskaya Oborona, Egor i Opizdenevshie and Kommunizm, stating, that everything he listens to is to some extent reflected in his music:

Personal life 
Letov's older brother is the free jazz saxophonist Sergey Letov.

In the late 1980s, Letov was close with Yanka Dyagileva, though it's not clear whether they were partners or not. He was married to Anna Volkova in the 1990s and to Natalia Chumakova from 1998 until his death. Letov had no children, as he and Chumakova both had childfree views.

Letov was an active LSD, marijuana, and psilocybin mushroom user but abstained from hard drugs. He also was a heavy alcohol drinker, which may have led to his premature death. He lived a rather secluded life with his wife in their khrushchevka flat in Chkalovsky Posyolok, a working-class district in eastern Omsk, spending most of his earnings on vinyls, books, and music equipment for his home studio.

Legacy

Letov was always a controversial figure. While some considered him as a genius, others completely rejected him. Famous musical critic Artemy Troitsky spoke of Letov as a poseur, misanthrope and very pretentious person, whose musical abilities were "very mediocre" (this, though, might be a reaction to Letov's attack on Troitsky in 1990 at the Alexander Bashlachev memorial concert, where he publicly accused Troitsky in "conversion of whole Soviet rock into shit"). Poet Elena Fanailova stated that Letov was "really fucked up and really free artist, whose main and only mission was to experience limits of his own freedom" and "certainly large, significant author, who created his own world – which, though, works only in the context of the post-Soviet civilization". Most contemporary critics consider Letov an important person in the post-Soviet culture and one of the best Russian poets of the late 20th century, although disputes about this status are still common; while the importance of his legacy is not denied, controversy remains regarding his radical political statements. As for Letov himself, he repeatedly stated that his personal views and opinions, or even his person, should be of no interest to anyone, and that his art is the only thing that matters:

Discography

Bibliography
Yegor Letov, Yanka Dyagileva, Konstantin Ryabinov. Russian field of experiments, 1994. 
Yegor Letov. I don't believe in Anarchy, 1997. .
Yegor Letov. Poems, 2003. .
Yegor Letov. Autographs. Drafts and drawings, vol. 1, 2009.  
Yegor Letov. Autographs. Drafts and drawings, vol. 2, 2011. .
Yegor Letov. Poems (second edition), 2011. .

Film 
 I Don't Believe in Anarchy, Documentary, RUS/CH 2015, Dir.: Anna Tsyrlina, Natalya Chumakova
 Project Egor Letov Documentary, Medusa 2019

References

External links
 Official website
 UnOfficial website
 Yegor Letov on Last.fm
 Yegor Letov on ulike.net
 Film-Website for I Don't Believe in Anarchy
 Grazhdanskaya Oborona lyrics
 Russian punks: The ideology, music and lifestyle

1964 births
2008 deaths
Russian punk rock musicians
Russian rock singers
People from Omsk
Political party founders
National Bolshevik Party politicians
Post-punk musicians
Russian male poets
Russian experimental musicians
Psychedelic rock musicians
20th-century Russian poets
20th-century Russian singers
Soviet male singer-songwriters
Russian male singer-songwriters
20th-century Russian male writers
20th-century Russian male singers
Childfree